God's Little Acre is a 1933 novel by Erskine Caldwell about a dysfunctional farming family in Georgia obsessed with sex and wealth. The novel's sexual themes were so controversial that the New York Society for the Suppression of Vice asked a New York state court to censor it. Although controversial, the novel became an international best seller with over 10 million copies sold, and was published as an Armed Services Edition during WWII. God's Little Acre is Caldwell's most popular novel, although his reputation is often tied to his 1932 novel Tobacco Road, which was listed in the Modern Library 100 Best Novels. God's Little Acre was later adapted as a 1958 film starring Robert Ryan.

Plot summary

The novel, told from a third-person perspective, is set in the early 1930s during the Great Depression. Ty Ty Walden is a widower who owns a small farm in Georgia, just across the border from South Carolina. His daughter, Rosamund, is married to Will Thompson, a worker in a cotton textile mill. Another daughter, whom everyone in the novel refers to as Darling Jill, is unmarried.  His son, Buck Walden, is married to the beautiful Griselda. Buck and Griselda live on the farm with Ty Ty and Ty Ty's other (unmarried) son, Shaw. Pluto Swint, an obese and lazy local farmer, sexually desires and wants to marry Darling Jill, who constantly humiliates him. 

Ty Ty is obsessed with finding gold on his land, and he, Buck, and Shaw spend most of their time digging holes on the farm. Ty Ty has promised to donate any profits generated by a  parcel of the farm to the church, but, terrified that gold will be found on "God's acre", he keeps moving the acre marker around. Only two African American hired hands, Uncle Felix and Black Sam, do any farming on the property, and the Waldens largely live off loans and what little income Felix and Sam generate. The local union of mill workers was locked out by management 18 months earlier after they protested against a wage cut.  Extensive poverty now afflicts the towns of Scottsville and Clark's Mill, and the Horse Creek Valley (where the Waldens live). Will fantasizes about entering the mill and turning on the power again to bring employment back to the townspeople.

The novel opens with Pluto Swint arriving at the Walden farm to announce that he is running for county sheriff. Pluto mentions that an albino will be able to dowse for gold and tells Ty Ty that an albino was spotted in the southern part of the county. Ty Ty, Buck, and Shaw drive off to kidnap the albino. 

Pluto and Darling Jill drive to the Thompson house in Scottsville, and spend the night there. The next morning, Will makes love to Darling Jill while Rosamund is out buying hairpins; when Rosamund returns she discovers the two naked in bed together and beats Darling Jill with a hair brush.  She fires a gun twice at Will but misses, and he flees the house "naked as a jay-bird" though an open window. Rosamund and Darling Jill reconcile through tears, "as though suffering a common bereavement."

Later that day Will returns wearing just a pair of borrowed shorts.  After he gets dressed Pluto drives Rosamund, Will and Darling Jill back to Ty Ty's house. On the way, they talk about Jim Leslie, another son of Ty Ty's, who started as a mill worker and married a rich man's daughter. Jim has become a wealthy cotton broker who now snubs mill workers as "lint-heads."

Ty Ty, Buck, and Shaw return with “the albino”, a boy in his late teens named Dave Dawson. Ty Ty speaks at length about Darling Jill's beauty. After supper, Dave takes Darling Jill into the woods and has intercourse with her. Ty Ty and Buck search for them, and then watch them make love, although Ty Ty declares that he only thought they were hugging each other, since he couldn't see a thing in the pale light. (There are undercurrents of incest throughout the novel.)

The second day, Will arrives at the Walden farm. Shaw and Buck (who suspects that Will is intending to seduce Griselda) engage in a fist-fight with him, but Ty Ty breaks it up. Will talks to Dave, who says he does not want to return to his poverty-stricken home in the southern swamps. 

That night, the family drives into town so Ty Ty can ask his estranged son Jim Leslie for a loan. Ty Ty, Darling Jill, and Griselda meet with Jim, who reluctantly gives Ty Ty $300., warning him not to ask for any more money and advising him to farm the land instead of looking for gold.   Before the family drives back home, Jim tells Griselda that he wants her even if he has to go to the farm and drag her back.  He puts his arm around her and attempts to kiss her, but the car takes off and he only succeeds in tearing her dress.  

Later that night at the Walden farm, Ty Ty is still worried that the albino Dave wants to run away, but his fears are allayed when he and Buck discover Dave and Uncle Felix sleeping peacefully in the barn. A short time later, Ty Ty watches his daughter-in-law Griselda undress, and catches a good glimpse of her bare skin as she slips on her nightgown. 

The morning of the third day, Pluto drives Will, Rosamund, Darling Jill, and Griselda back to the Thompson house in South Carolina. Will goes out on mill business, and returns highly agitated and determined to open the mill the next morning.  After a while he calmly looks at Griselda and tells her that the time has come, and nothing in God’s world can stop him now, and in an insane burst of flying fingers and throbbing muscles he tears off her clothes like a madman as she watches unresistingly, until she stands before him, waiting and trembling.  She does not try to escape from him, but backs away until he catches her and drags her to another part of the house. Through the open doors they are seen and heard by Rosamund and Darling Jill and Pluto.  Never before had Darling Jill felt so completely aroused. No one but Pluto got much sleep that night, and the next morning Will’s three paramours — his wife Rosamund, and his sisters-in-law Darling Jill and Griselda — hurriedly, easily and lovingly fix his breakfast. 

During the fourth day, Will learns that the mill owners have brought in out-of-state security guards to keep the plant closed. He and some other men break into the plant and turn the machinery on. The guards shoot Will in the back, killing him, leaving the three women in shock and despair. That night, Darling Jill takes Pluto by the hand and leads him to the bed, where they fall asleep holding one another.

On the morning of the fifth day, Will is buried. That afternoon, Pluto drives Darling Jill, Rosamund, and Griselda to the Walden farm. Ty Ty, Buck, and Shaw learn of Will's death. Buck suspects that Griselda has been unfaithful with Will. The family argues ferociously during dinner, and Buck runs out of the house and does not return. Pluto also leaves that night.

On the morning of the sixth day, Jim Leslie arrives at the farm, telling his father "I know what I want, and I came after it."  He storms in the house looking for Griselda, but Buck and Shaw follow right in after him. Buck grabs a shotgun off the wall and Jim Leslie runs out the front door with Buck close behind. Jim Leslie stops running and turns to face his brother, shaking his fist. Buck says "I reckon you'll leave her alone now" and shoots twice, killing Jim Leslie. 

Ty Ty is in shock that he could not prevent blood being spilled on his land -- the blood of one of his children.  And although he was completely exhausted, and knew that he would soon be too old to dig anymore, he returned to the hole to dig some more. He also willed that God's little acre would now follow Buck, stopping where Buck stopped so that his son would be upon it no matter where he went.  In the final paragraphs, it is implied that Buck commits suicide with the same shotgun he used to kill his brother.

Themes
Published by Viking Press in 1933, God's Little Acre was in part influenced by textile mill strikes in Gastonia, North Carolina. The novel is "proletarian", focusing on the "plight of workers deprived of union protection." Similarly, the novel deals with the misuse and abuse of land in the South.

Controversy
God's Little Acre contained scenes considered sexually explicit, leading the New York Society for the Suppression of Vice to take Caldwell and Viking Press to court for disseminating pornography. Over 60 literary figures supported the book, placing pressure on the New York State Magistrates' Court, which ruled in favor of Caldwell's rights to freedom of expression. Caldwell counter-sued the literary society for false arrest and malicious prosecution.

In 1947, the city of Saint Paul, Minnesota, banned the novel for being pornographic.

In 1950, the book was banned in Boston upon the recommendation of the Watch and Ward Society, one of that society's final activities of censorship. (Boston continued censoring works into the 1960s.)

Cultural references
In the 1955 film Mister Roberts, Ensign Pulver (Jack Lemmon) proudly states that he read God's Little Acre through to the end. Mr. Roberts (Henry Fonda) is not impressed and tells Doc (William Powell), "He's been reading God's Little Acre for over a year now. He's underlined every erotic passage and added exclamation points. And after a certain pornographic climax, he's inserted the words 'Well written.'" 

In the Amazon television series Goliath (S1 E2), Billy Bob Thornton's character uses God's Little Acre as a reference for redefining rock-bottom in an Alcoholics Anonymous meeting.

In The Mary Tyler Moore Show episode "The Birds and ... Um ... Bess" (S2 E1), when asked how he learned about sex for the first time, Ted Baxter says: "I read a book. Told me everything I needed to know. ...God's Little Acre."

References

1933 American novels
American novels adapted into films
Farms in fiction
Georgia (U.S. state) in fiction
Novels set in Georgia (U.S. state)
Obscenity controversies in literature
Southern Gothic novels
Viking Press books
Works by Erskine Caldwell